Kulduk-Too is a northern offspur of the Alay Range in the Batken Region of Kyrgyzstan. It is located between the valley of the river Sokh and that of its tributary Kojashkan. It stretches from west to east, south of the Aydarken depression, and is connected in the east with the Kuruksay range. The northern slope, long and gentle, gradually descends to Sokh river and Khaidarkan depression. The southern slope, short and steep, features great variations in altitudes. Both slopes are deeply dissected by tributaries of Sokh river. The range is composed of Silurian and Carboniferous rocks: (shale, limestone, and conglomerate) and more rarely by intrusive rock such as granite and granodiorite.

References

Mountain ranges of Kyrgyzstan
Batken Region